Walter Eugene Powell (April 25, 1931 – January 17, 2020) was an American educator and politician of the Republican party who served as a U.S. Representative from Ohio from 1971 to 1975.

Life and career
Powell was born in Hamilton, Ohio, the son of Anna and Walter Powell. Before entering politics, Powell was a history teacher.

He met his wife, Bobbi Mae, in the summer of 1951, as summer employees of LeSourdsville Lake. They married June 2, 1952.

He began his career as the city clerk of Fairfield, Ohio in 1956, and became a member of Fairfield City Council in 1958.  In 1960, Powell successfully ran for the Ohio House of Representatives.  He was reelected in 1962, and 1964.

The Voting Rights Act of 1965 provided Powell with incentive to run for the Ohio Senate, which he did.  He ended up winning, and took a seat in the upper chamber on January 3, 1967.  While he was up for reelection to the Senate in 1970, he instead initially opted to run for Ohio State Treasurer.  However, he eventually entered the race a seat in the United States House of Representatives. He went on to win the seat, and ultimately swapped seats with his predecessor, Buz Lukens, who then was appointed to Powell's senate seat.

Powell went on to serve two terms in Congress, and opted to retire after his second term ended in 1975. He was succeeded by Tom Kindness.

Retirement
Following his tenure in Congress, he retired to Middletown, Ohio. He became a high school administrator, rising to the level of principal. He later changed careers, attending University of Cincinnati Law School and passing the bar exam at age 53. He worked for many years thereafter as a real estate, tax, and probate lawyer.

Powell died on January 17, 2020.

See also

 List of United States representatives from Ohio

References

External links

1931 births
2020 deaths
20th-century American politicians
American school administrators
Educators from Ohio
Heidelberg University (Ohio) alumni
Republican Party members of the Ohio House of Representatives
Miami University alumni
Ohio city council members
Ohio lawyers
Republican Party Ohio state senators
People from Fairfield, Ohio
People from Middletown, Ohio
Politicians from Hamilton, Ohio
University of Cincinnati College of Law alumni
Republican Party members of the United States House of Representatives from Ohio